The 2nd Supply Battalion is a battalion of the United States Marine Corps that specializes in distributing and warehousing military goods and equipment. They are based out of Marine Corps Base Camp Lejeune, North Carolina and they fall under the command of Combat Logistics Regiment 25 and the 2nd Marine Logistics Group.

Subordinate units
 Headquarters and Service Company
 Ammunition Company
 Supply Company
 Medical Logistics Company
 MAGTF Materiel Distribution Center Company (unofficial)

History

Activated 26 May 2006 at Marine Corps Base Camp Lejeune, North Carolina, as Combat Logistics Regiment 25 and assigned to the 2nd Marine Logistics Group.  Elements of the battalion participated in Operation Iraqi Freedom, Iraq, from February 2007 through January 2008.

See also

History of the United States Marine Corps
List of United States Marine Corps battalions

References

 2nd Supply Battalion's official website

Logistics battalions of the United States Marine Corps